Thomas Henry Tizard  (1839 – 17 February 1924) was an English oceanographer, hydrographic surveyor, and navigator.

He was born in Weymouth, Dorset and educated at the Royal Hospital School, Greenwich, at that time noted for its advanced mathematical training. He entered the Royal Navy by competitive examination as master's assistant in 1854 and served in the Baltic during the Crimean war. In 1860 he was promoted second master and commenced surveying in the Rifleman Reed, during which time he commanded the tender Saracen for three years. Tizard was largely responsible for an important series of observations on the surface and under-currents in the Straits of Gibraltar, which set at rest the vexed question of the movements of these waters.

An atoll in the South China Sea that Tizard surveyed in the 1860s from aboard HMS Rifleman was later named Tizard Bank after him.

The appointment opened to him the greatest opportunity of his life in bringing him into contact with the leaders of the science of oceanography. The Challenger expedition resulted in a vast increase of knowledge of the physical condition of the oceans and of the distribution of marine life, and in the progressive improvement of apparatus and methods of research. Tizard remained with the Challenger until she paid off in 1876, and spent the next three years at the Admiralty writing the narrative of the voyage in association with Sir John Murray.

In 1879 Tizard resumed surveying duties afloat, and took charge of the Home survey. During the nine years that he held this command he wrote many papers of scientific value and interest. Among these may be mentioned a report on deep-sea exploration in the Faroe Channel; lectures on Marine Surveying and Hydrographic Surveying, and an article on the 'Thames Estuary' (Nature, 1890)
which is of great permanent value. He was promoted to staff captain in 1889, and in 1891 was appointed assistant hydrographer of the navy, and was elected a Fellow of the Royal Society. He was appointed Companion of the Order of the Bath (CB) in the 1899 Birthday Honours.

In 1881 Tizard married Mary Elizabeth Churchward. They had five children, including one son, Sir Henry Tizard.

References 

1839 births
1924 deaths
People from Weymouth, Dorset
Companions of the Order of the Bath
Fellows of the Royal Society
Royal Navy officers
Royal Navy personnel of the Crimean War
English oceanographers
English surveyors
English hydrographers
People educated at the Royal Hospital School